SN 1998bw was a rare broad-lined Type Ic gamma ray burst supernova detected on 26 April 1998 in the ESO 184-G82 spiral galaxy, which some astronomers believe may be an example of a collapsar (hypernova). The supernova has been linked to GRB 980425, which was detected on 25 April 1998, the first time a gamma-ray burst has been linked to a supernova. The supernova is approximately 140 million light years away, very close for a gamma ray burst source.

The region of the galaxy where the supernova occurred hosts stars 5-8 million years old and is relatively free from dust. A nearby region hosts multiple Wolf-Rayet stars less than 3 million years old, but it is unlikely that the supernova progenitor could be a runaway from that region. The implication is that the progenitor was a star originally  if it exploded as a single star at the end of its life.

References

External links
 Light curves and spectra on the Open Supernova Catalog

Hypernovae
Supernovae
19980426
Telescopium (constellation)